Hepatocystis perronae is a species of parasitic protozoa. They are transmitted by flies of the genus Culicoides and infect mammals.

Taxonomy

This species was described in 1971 by Landau and Adam.

Distribution

This species is found in Angola and Congo-Brazzaville.

Hosts

This species infects the Angolan fruit bat (Lissonycteris angolensis) and the little collared fruit bat (Myonycteris torquata).

References

Parasites of Diptera
Culicoides
Parasites of bats
Haemosporida